William Lavery (born circa. 1887; date of death unknown) was an English footballer who played for Fylde, Preston North End, Leicester Fosse, West Ham United, Belfast Celtic, Middlesbrough, Raith Rovers, St Mirren, Johnstone and Port Vale in the period before and after World War I. During that war he served with other footballers and fans in McCrae's Battalion of the Royal Scots.

Career
Lavery played for Fylde, Preston North End, Leicester Fosse (on trial), West Ham United, where he made 17 Southern League appearances, and two in the FA Cup, Belfast Celtic (in two spells), Middlesbrough, Raith Rovers, St Mirren and had a trial with Johnstone, before joining Port Vale in December 1921. He made his debut on 24 December, in a 3–2 defeat by Burnley at Turf Moor, filling in for Bob Pursell. He played the next four of five Second Division games, but did not feature again in the remainder of the 1921–22 season. During the next season he only played one FA Cup game, a 2–0 defeat to Wrexham at The Old Recreation Ground, before being released in the summer.

Career statistics
Source:

References

1880s births
Year of death missing
People from Thornton-Cleveleys
English footballers
Association football fullbacks
Preston North End F.C. players
West Ham United F.C. players
Belfast Celtic F.C. players
Middlesbrough F.C. players
Raith Rovers F.C. players
St Mirren F.C. players
Johnstone F.C. players
Port Vale F.C. players
Scottish Football League players
English Football League players
Southern Football League players
McCrae's Battalion
British Army personnel of World War I
Royal Scots soldiers